Open TV, formerly Epsilontv, is a Greek free-to-air television station, based in Paiania, East Attica.

History
It belonged to Radio-television S.A. which was sold from Communist Party of Greece to the Cypriot offshore company A-Orizon Media Ltd. under contract came on July 31, 2013, and replaced the 902 channel. The operation began on September 11, 2013, at 00:10 with broadcast Entertainment Gossip News with presenter Maria Louisa Vourou.

The first station's newscast sent out the same day at 19:30 pm, with main presenter journalist George Karameros. Since October 2013 the channel has a full schedule, including Press News, information, entertainment, cultural and sports programs. George Tragas for a few months showed the program State of Siege and subsequently Restricted Area. Also presented program Without Anesthetic and Sniper. Since September 2014, the main news program has been presented by Lina Klitou. In 2017, the channel was sold to Ivan Savvidis. Filippos Vrionis was the former owner.

Broadcasting signaling
The E Channel began broadcasting from its platform Digea on 11 September 2013. On 22 November 2013 the channel joined the Cable platform Nova Greece at position 114 and Nova Cyprus at position 613 and from December 15, 2014, and joined the Cable platform of Cosmote TV at position 111. On the afternoon of 8 March 2016 officially launched the E Channel to broadcast in high definition (HD). Also, old Epsilon TV has been working with Greek New Epsilon TV, Extra Channel and Cypriot Plus TV.

Controversies
The Open TV program "Ευτυχείτε" (Eutixeite, lit. "happenings") and its host Katerina Kainourgiou were criticized due to her and the show's guests ridiculing South Korean pop singers Oh Se-hun, Kang Daniel, V and Jungkook who made it on a list of "the 100 most handsome faces of 2018".

Current programs

Daytime

Talk shows
Poios einai Proiniatika? (Who is so morning?) (2021-today)
Open Weekend (2021-today)
Mera Mesimeri me ti Marion (In broad daylight with Marion) (2022-today)

Former shows

Soap operas
I Teleftaia Ora (2021-2022)
O Prigkipas tis Fotias (2018-2019)

Game shows
Joker (2020-2021)
Enas gia olous! (2019-2020)
Poios rotaei? (2018-2019)

Talk and variety shows
Glam Wars (2021-2022)
Familiar (2021)
Milise mou (2021)
Green Kitchen by Madame Ginger (2021)
Radio Arvyla (2021)
Style me up (2020-2021)
The Booth (2020)
Kitchen' Health (2020)
Open Ellada (2020)
Annita Koita (2019-2021)
Mesimeri Yes (2019-2020)
Me to N & me to S (2019)
Ola lathos (2019)
Studio Open (2019)
Mesimeriatika (2019)
Ela Xamogela! (2018-2021)
Eftixeite (2018-2021)
Top Story (2018-2019)
Kouzina gia dyo (2018-2019)
Gia tin parea (2018-2019)

Primetime / Late night

Talk shows
After Dark with Themis Georgantas (2021-present)
Anoixta with Annita Pania (2021-present)
Total Football (2018-present)

Others
Taxi with Dionysis Atzarakis (2021-present)
Ena tragoudi akoma with Giorgos Theofanous (2021-present)
Eikones with Tasos Dousis (2019-present)

Former shows

Talk shows
Aples Kouventes (2021)
The Grandmother with Ieroklis Mihailidis (2021)
Gramma gia sena with Viky Hatzivasileiou (2020)
Info-19 with Niki Lymperaki (2020)
Open Mind with Elli Stai (2019)

Others
I Proklisi (2021-2022)
Into your heart with Giorgos Mavridis (2021-2022)
Into the skin with Giorgos Mavridis (2021)
Kai Egeneto Ellas (2020-2021)
Just the 2 of Us (2020)
Paggenger (2019-2020)
My Greece with Despina Vandi (2019-2020)
The X Factor (2019)
Revenge Body with Ioanna Lili (2019)
Al Sihtiri with Lakis Lazopoulos (2019)
Al Tsantiri News with Lakis Lazopoulos (2019)
It's Show Time! with Nikos Koklonis (2019)
Oi peirates tou Aigaiou (2019)
Project Runaway Greece (2018-2019)

Series
To Kokkino Potami (2019-2020)
Gia Panta Paidia (2018-2019)
Eleftheri Sxesi (2018-2019)
Ou Fonefseis (2018-2019)

References

1990 establishments in Greece
Greek-language television stations
Television networks in Greece
Television channels and stations established in 1990
Television channels in Greece
Mass media companies of Greece